USL League One (USL1) is a professional men's soccer league in the United States that had its inaugural season in 2019. The Division III league is operated by United Soccer League, the same group that operates the Division II USL Championship and other leagues.  the league has 12 teams who play 32 regular season games, followed by playoffs.

History
The USL Championship was granted second division sanctioning by the United States Soccer Federation in January 2017, leaving the third tier of American soccer unoccupied. From 1996 to 2009, the United Soccer League operated leagues at the lower divisions under various names, including the USL Second Division in the third tier. On April 2, 2017, the USL announced that it would launch a new third division league in 2019, with a minimum of eight clubs and relaxed requirements compared to the second division USL. The new league had the temporary name USL Division III (USL D3). The league announced that they would target cities with a population of 150,000 to one million, mostly in cities currently without a professional team.

In the following months, the league began searching for cities and markets in which to locate new member teams. A tour of prospective cities in the southeastern United States was conducted by the league's vice president from April to May 2017, followed by a visit to North Carolina and a similar tour of the Midwest in late May. After the closing of the southeastern tour, the league announced a possible plan for Tormenta FC, a Premier Development League team from Georgia, to join the league. 

The unveiling of the first founding member, South Georgia Tormenta FC, took place on January 25, 2018. This was followed by FC Tucson on February 6, Greenville Triumph SC on March 13, and Madison, Wisconsin on May 17. Toronto FC II of the USL was announced on July 2, and Chattanooga, Tennessee was announced on August 1. Three USL Championship teams, Penn FC, the Rochester Rhinos and the Richmond Kickers, also announced plans to move to League One by 2020 due to financial difficulties. On October 2, 2018, the tenth and final founding member was revealed to be the reserve team of FC Dallas. Four days later, the club unveiled its branding as North Texas SC.

The league filed for Division III status with the USSF on August 14, 2018. Ten founding teams were listed in the application. On December 14, 2018, USSF voted to provisionally sanction League One as a Division 3 league for 2019. The league currently shares Division III status with MLS Next Pro and the National Independent Soccer Association.

The first League One game was played on March 29, 2019, when Tormenta FC defeated Greenville Triumph SC 1–0 before a crowd of 3,519 at Eagle Field in Erk Russell Park. Alex Morrell scored the first goal in the 72nd minute.

On May 1, 2019, an Omaha, Nebraska team to start play in 2020 was unveiled. On October 9, 2019, it was announced that both the New England Revolution and Inter Miami CF would be placing reserve teams in the league, bringing the total number of teams for the 2020 season to 12 teams. On October 21, 2019, it was announced that one of its inaugural teams, Lansing Ignite FC, would fold after its first and only season in existence. On October 28, 2020, USL announced that Fort Wayne FC would join USL League Two as an expansion side for the 2021 season, with a plan to compete in the league for two seasons before joining League One for the 2023 season.

On June 21, 2021, Major League Soccer announced the creation of a new professional soccer league, MLS Next Pro, which began play in 2022 and would host all of MLS's reserve teams along with some independent teams. Fort Lauderdale CF, New England Revolution II, North Texas SC and Toronto FC II all joined MLS Next Pro after the 2021 League One season. Former League One side Orlando City B joined MLS Next Pro for the inaugural 2022 season following a hiatus that began after the club completed the 2020 League One season. Rochester New York FC, formerly known as Rochester Rhinos, announced on December 5, 2021, that the club would be joining MLS Next Pro as its first independent club. Rochester had announced in 2018 their intentions to join League One for the 2020 season, though stadium delays and other financial issues kept the club on hiatus for four years. On October 5, 2021, the USL announced it had awarded Lexington Pro Soccer an expansion team for the 2023 season. It would be League One's first club based in Kentucky. The club's identity was revealed as Lexington Sporting Club on March 22, 2022.

Central Valley Fuego FC, Charlotte Independence and Northern Colorado Hailstorm FC began play in 2022. On June 3, 2022, USL announced that they had granted a group based out of Wilmington, North Carolina the exclusive rights to pursue a League One expansion team for the area with the goal of joining in 2024. Wilmington had been the home of long time USL club Wilmington Hammerheads FC, who played in various USL leagues from 1996 until 2017. On July 12, 2022, USL announced that a newly formed club, Santa Barbara Sky FC, would be joining League One for the 2024 season. It would be the league's second club in California, joining Central Valley Fuego. Following the conclusion of the 2022 regular season, FC Tucson announced a self-relegation back to USL League Two. Shortly after FC Tucson announced their self-relegation, One Knoxville SC announced they would turn professional and join League One for 2023, following a successful debut season that saw them reach the USL League Two conference finals. On December 8, 2022, it was announced that USL League Two club Lane United FC acquired exclusive rights to pursue a League One franchise in Lane County, Oregon.

Teams 
The league will have 12 teams participating in the 2023 season. 
 Future teams 

 Location map

Former teams

Timeline

Champions
Teams that no longer participate in USL League One are in italics.

USL League One Finals

See also
 Soccer in the United States
 Professional sports leagues in the United States
 USL Championship
 USL League Two
 USL W League
 USL Second Division
 National Independent Soccer Association

References

External links

 

 
1
3

Third level association football leagues in North America
Professional soccer leagues in the United States
Summer association football leagues
Sports leagues established in 2017
2017 establishments in the United States
Professional sports leagues in the United States
Professional sports leagues in Canada
Multi-national professional sports leagues